Tikrit University is an Iraqi university located in Tikrit, Saladin Province, Iraq. It was established in 1987. It is one of the largest universities in Iraq with over 30,000 students. While it has faced challenges in recent years due to the conflict that has engulfed Iraq, it has begun to reemerge as a respected institution of higher education. It has sought to partner with other universities around the globe in an effort to reconnect its faculty and students to a global network.
As well University of Tikrit is accredited by Accreditation Service for International Colleges and Universities (ASIC UK).

References

External links
Official website 
Iraqi Ministry of Higher Education
Petroleum & Minral Engineering College Official website

Tikrit
Educational institutions established in 1987
1987 establishments in Iraq
Tikrit